Poker dice are dice which, instead of having number pips, have representations of playing cards upon them. Poker dice have six sides, one each of an Ace, King, Queen, Jack, 10, and 9, and are used to form a poker hand.

Each variety of poker dice varies slightly in regard to suits, though the ace of spades is almost universally represented. 9♣ and 10♦ are frequently found, while face cards are traditionally represented not by suit, but instead by color: red for kings, green for queens and blue for jacks. Manufacturers have not standardized the colors of the face sides. The game can also be played with ordinary dice.

As a game
 

The classic poker dice game is played with 5 dice and two or more players. Each player has a total of 3 rolls and the ability to hold dice in between rolls. After the three rolls, the best hand wins.

In most variations, a straight only counts as a Bust (high-card). A Straight is less probable than a Full House, so, if counted, it should rank above a Full House, though tradition usually ranks it below Full House, as in card poker. Neither a "flush" nor a "straight flush" is a possible hand, due to the lack of suits on the dice.

In some rules, only a straight to a King is called a Straight, while a straight to an Ace is called (somewhat incorrectly) a Flush. Each one has an exact probability of 120 / 7776. Under these rules, a Straight beats a Full House (unlike in card poker, but correctly reflecting its probability) but does not beat a Four of a Kind (incorrectly reflecting its lower probability). A Flush beats a Four of a Kind (as in card poker, and correctly reflecting its lower probability).

Probabilities
The poker dice hand rankings and the corresponding probabilities of rolling that hand are as follows
(not sorted by probability but from highest to lowest ranking):

*Busts have much lower probability than in card poker, because there are only 6 values instead of 13, making pairs and straights much more likely than with cards. In poker dice there are in fact only four possible bust hands: [A K Q J 9], [A K Q 10 9], [A K J 10 9], and [A Q J 10 9]; both other no-pair hands (i.e., in which either the A or the 9 are missing) are straights. Consequently, in some variants of the rules, straights are counted as busts.

Variants
Marlboro once marketed a set of octahedral poker dice that included suits; each die had slightly different numberings, ranging from 7 up to ace. A similar set is currently manufactured by Koplow Games.

In 1974, Aurora produced a set of 12-sided poker dice called "Jimmy the Greek Odds Maker Poker Dice" and in 2000, Aurora/Rex Games produced a similar set under the name "Royal Poker Dice". The sets featured five 12-sided dice allowing for all 52 playing cards to be represented. The remaining 8 faces featured stars and acted as wild cards allowing for every possible poker hand to be rolled.

A variant of Liar's dice is commonly used with Poker dice.  A two player game, players roll their own set of Poker dice behind a screen, and bid and call based on Poker dice hands.

See also
Crown and Anchor
List of poker hands
Yahtzee
Liar's dice

References

External links
Rules for Dice Poker at BrainKing.com (similar to Yahtzee)
 (no straights)
Poker dice at Britannica.com

Dice games
Poker variants